Bement Township is a township in Piatt County, Illinois, USA.  As of the 2010 census, its population was 1,893 and it contained 798 housing units.

Geography

Cities and towns
 Bement
 Ivesdale (west quarter)

Extinct towns
 Bodmann
 Piatt

Adjacent townships
 Monticello Township (north)
 Colfax Township, Champaign County (northeast)
 Sadorus Township, Champaign County (east)
 Garrett Township, Douglas County (southeast)
 Unity Township (south)
 Cerro Gordo Township (southwest)
 Willow Branch Township (northwest)

Cemeteries
The township contains one cemetery, Bement.

Major highways
  Illinois State Route 105

Airports and landing strips
 Bartram Landing Strip
 Kirwan Landing Strip
 Triple Creek Airport

Demographics

References

 U.S. Board on Geographic Names (GNIS)
 United States Census Bureau cartographic boundary files

External links
 US-Counties.com
 City-Data.com
 Illinois State Archives

Townships in Piatt County, Illinois
1859 establishments in Illinois
Populated places established in 1859
Townships in Illinois